The AAA Mega Championship is a professional wrestling world heavyweight championship in the Mexican Lucha Libre AAA Worldwide (AAA) promotion. Known officially in Spanish as the Mega Campeonato AAA, it is sometimes referred to in the English-language press as the "AAA World Heavyweight Championship". The title is the top championship of the AAA promotion. The current champion is El Hijo del Vikingo.

The title was established in 2007 via a single elimination tournament billed as the "Torneo Campeón de Campeones", or Champion of Champions Tournament, which effectively unified the International Wrestling Council (IWC) World Heavyweight Championship, the Grand Prix Championship Wrestling (GPCW) SUPER-X Monster Championship, the Mexican National Heavyweight Championship, and the Universal Wrestling Association (UWA) World Light Heavyweight Championship. The tournament field included the four reigning champions of the aforementioned titles as well as the number one contender to each championship. El Mesías, who entered the tournament as the IWC World Heavyweight Champion, became the inaugural AAA Mega Champion upon defeating the UWA World Light Heavyweight Champion entrant Chessman in the final round.

Inaugural Championship Tournament bracket

  IWC World Heavyweight Champion
  GPCW SUPER-X Monster Champion
  Mexican National Heavyweight Champion
  UWA World Light Heavyweight Champion

Reigns 
Overall, there have been 18 AAA Mega Championship reigns and 11 total champions, and the title has been vacated twice. The inaugural champion was El Mesías, who defeated Chessman in the final of an eight-man tournament at the Verano de Escándalo event on September 16, 2007, to become champion. El Texano Jr.'s first reign as champion gave the title world status when he defended it in Mexico. Kenny Omega had the longest reign at 765 days. Jeff Jarrett had the shortest reign at 83 days. El Mesías holds the record for the most reigns with four. El Texano Jr., Fénix, and Kenny Omega are the only three wrestlers to have held the title for a full consecutive year.

In 2011, the then-AAA Mega Champion and Total Nonstop Action Wrestling (TNA) founder Jeff Jarrett appeared with a redesigned version of the title belt on TNA programming. TNA used the Mega Championship belt on their programming, but due to Spike TV, then TNA's broadcaster, not allowing TNA to refer to AAA by name, a silver hexagonal plate was used to cover the AAA faceplate. While Jarrett appeared in TNA, the title was referred to as the "Mexican Heavyweight Championship". On April 21, 2013, the title was defended outside AAA for the first time at Puerto Rico's World Wrestling League (WWL). In March 2015, the AAA Mega Champion El Patrón Alberto defended the championship in Lucha Underground, made possible through AAA's joint ownership of Lucha Underground.

El Hijo del Vikingo is the current champion in his first reign. He won the vacant title after defeating Samuray del Sol, Jay Lethal, Bobby Fish, and Bandido in a Five-way match on at Triplemanía Regia II in Monterrey, Mexico on December 4, 2021. The previous champion, Kenny Omega, vacated it due to injury on November 22, 2021. During his reign, Omega also defended the title in All Elite Wrestling (AEW) – his home promotion – via a partnership between AAA and AEW.

Title history

Combined reigns

References
General

Specific

External links
Lucha Libre AAA Worldwide website

Lucha Libre AAA Worldwide championships
World heavyweight wrestling championships
Professional wrestling champion lists